Don't Fumble, Darling (German: Nicht fummeln, Liebling) is a 1970 West German comedy film directed by May Spils and starring Werner Enke, Gila von Weitershausen and Henry van Lyck. The film was distributed by the German subsidiary of Paramount Pictures. It was a commercial success on its release, one of the biggest hits in Germany that year. The film was shot at the Bavaria Studios in Munich, and on location around the city during the summer of 1969.

Cast
Werner Enke as Charly
Gila von Weitershausen as Gila
Henry van Lyck as Harry
Benno Hoffmann as Herbert Oehl
Elke Haltaufderheide as Elke
Jean Launay as Lux
Otto Sander as Revoluzzer Otto
Iris Gras as Starlet
Sabrina A. Wengen as Starlet 
Michael Cromer as Klaus-Peter Pumm
Johannes Buzalski as 	Gefängniswärter Bumski
Ingrid Stahl as Reni Tenz
Kasimir Esser as Kasimir
Karl Schönböck as Actor in Geiselgasteig
Erica Beer as Actress in Geiselgasteig

References

Bibliography
Bock, Hans-Michael & Bergfelder, Tim. The Concise Cinegraph: Encyclopaedia of German Cinema. Berghahn Books, 2009.

External links

1970 films
1970 comedy films
German comedy films
West German films
Films directed by May Spils
Films shot at Bavaria Studios
Films set in Munich
1970s German-language films
1970s German films

[[de:Nicht fummeln, Liebling]